Kelvin Miranda (born January 8, 1999) is a Filipino actor, model and singer.

Miranda is best known for his role as Mark Sta. Maria in the Netflix original film Dead Kids (2019) and the lead role in the GTV series The Lost Recipe (2021).

Early life 
Miranda was born on January 8, 1999, in Caloocan, Metro Manila, Philippines. He attended Caloocan High School, where he showed signs of becoming a future actor through his participations in school events. He was also looked up to by his schoolmates for his talents in singing, dancing, playing music instruments, and writing poems.

Due to his introversion, Miranda initially faced difficulties trying his luck in the entertainment industry, an idea of his sister.

Career

2016-2018: Career beginnings
Miranda's film debut was in the 2016 Star Cinema film Vince and Kath and James, where he appeared in an uncredited role as Kelvin. In 2017 he signed under GMA Artist Center, the talent agency of GMA Network.

For the next few years Miranda would have small parts in a number of GMA television shows, such as Kambal, Karibal, Tadhana, and Magpakailanman. Miranda's film career, meanwhile, was a combination of roles in independent films and various films with Regal Entertainment, such as Haunted Forest, The Hopeful Romantic, and Walwal.

2019-2020: Breakthrough
After a series of supporting roles, in 2019, Miranda had a breakthrough role as the lead in the film Dead Kids, the first-ever Netflix original film from the Philippines. Miranda played Mark Santa Maria, a withdrawn teen known to classmates as a "dead kid" — a wallflower and wet blanket; the brainiest yet the poorest in school. The film received positive reviews from critics and Miranda was praised for his lead performance.

2021-present: Rising popularity
In 2021, Miranda had his first lead role in television, for the GTV show The Lost Recipe, where he starred opposite Mikee Quintos. He then was later partnered with Beauty Gonzalez in the top-rating afternoon series Stories from the Heart: Loving Miss Bridgette, a forbidden love story of a student and a teacher.

Filmography

Film

Television

Music videos

Awards and nominations

References

Living people
1999 births
GMA Network personalities
Filipino male film actors
Filipino male television actors
21st-century Filipino male actors
21st-century Filipino male singers
Filipino male models